Minoru Kubota (born 29 April 1930) is a Japanese weightlifter. He competed in the men's light heavyweight event at the 1960 Summer Olympics.

References

1930 births
Living people
Japanese male weightlifters
Olympic weightlifters of Japan
Weightlifters at the 1960 Summer Olympics
People from Kurashiki
Asian Games medalists in weightlifting
Asian Games silver medalists for Japan
Asian Games bronze medalists for Japan
Weightlifters at the 1951 Asian Games
Weightlifters at the 1954 Asian Games
Weightlifters at the 1958 Asian Games
Medalists at the 1951 Asian Games
Medalists at the 1954 Asian Games
Medalists at the 1958 Asian Games
20th-century Japanese people
21st-century Japanese people